Sylwia Iwona Spurek (born 29 January 1976) is a Polish politician, lawyer, attorney-at-law and lecturer who currently serves as a Member of the European Parliament.

For 2015 to 2019 she was Deputy Polish Ombudsman (serving Polish Ombudsman at the time was Adam Bodnar). She was a Spring (part of the Progressive Alliance of Socialists and Democrats group) Member of the European Parliament (MEP) elected in the 2019 European parliamentary election. She left Spring on 28 October 2019 and joined the Greens-EFA group in the European Parliament in September 2020.

Early life and education
Spurek was born on 29 January 1976 in Skarżysko-Kamienna, Poland. She graduated from University of Lodz Faculty of Law and Administration in 2000. She specializes in criminal, administrative, international and constitutional law. In 2000, she was a scholarship holder of the Legal Fellowship Program, a participant of International Women's Human Rights Clinic classes at the City University of New York. While in New York, she became involved in Hillary Clinton's 2000 election campaign. In 2004 she completed a legislative application.

In 2012, Spurek defended her doctoral dissertation on the legal aspects of preventing domestic violence, with a focus on isolating the perpetrator from the victim (supervisor: Eleonora Zielińska, judge of polish State Tribunal).

Career
Since 1999, Spurek has been involved in activities for human rights. After graduation worked as Attorney-at-Law. She was a lecturer at Gender Studies at the University of Warsaw and the Polish Academy of Sciences at postgraduate studies in Gender Mainstreaming. She also lectured on legal subjects at Lazarski University and SWPS University of Social Sciences and Humanities.

From 2002 to 2005 at the Secretariat of the Government Plenipotentiary for Equal Status of Women and Men, where she dealt with, among others government bill on counteracting domestic violence. In the years 2008–2015 she was a member of the Team for the European Court of Human Rights at the Ministry of Foreign Affairs.

In the years 2010–2012 she was a representative of the Chief of the Chancellery of the Prime Minister of Poland on the Rights Protection Committee. Until 2014, she was an adviser to the Prime Minister in the Legal Department of the Chancellery of the Prime Minister. Then, until June 2015, she was deputy head of the Office of the Government Plenipotentiary for Equal Treatment and was responsible, among others, for coordinating government work on the ratification of the Council of Europe Convention on preventing and combating violence against women and domestic violence.

On September 22, 2015, Spurek became the deputy of the Polish Ombudsman for equal treatment. She resigned from this function on February 28, 2019, after which she became involved in politics.

In March 2019, together with partner Marcin Anaszewicz, Spurek published the book Związek partnerski, rozmowy o Polsce (Domestic Partnerships, Talks about Poland, 2019), and all the profit from the sale of the book is transferred to the foundation International Movement for Animals Viva!.

Since 2019, he has been participating in the celebration of the 16 Days of Activism against Gender-based Violence. In 2021, on this occasion, it published the free publication Our Convention, which is the first full edition of the Istanbul Convention. In 2022, she dedicated her social campaign to cyberbullying against women. In the video spot, she posted real comments and threats that she had received under her posts on social media.

In 2022, as part of her parliamentary program "Wolni od Ferm" (Free from Farms), she published a free expert study "Smród, krew i łzy. Włącz myślenie, bądź zmianą" (Stench, blood and tears. Turn on thinking, be the change), which focuses on the impact of factory farms and the livestock sector in Poland on the environment, human rights and animal rights.

Political career
At the beginning of March 2019, Spurek became involved in the political project of Robert Biedroń - the Spring party. Spurek was elected in the 2019 European parliamentary election from Greater Poland - Poznan constituency as a member of the European Parliament. She belongs to the group of the Progressive Alliance of Socialists and Democrats (S&D).

In the European Parliament, Spurek has since been serving on the European Parliament Committee on Civil Liberties, Justice and Home Affairs and European Parliament Committee on the Environment, Public Health and Food Safety. Member of the Delegation for relations with Canada. She left Spring on 28 October 2019. She indicated as a reason for leaving party that the group has changed its statute. In September 2020, Spurek announced she would now sit in the Greens-EFA Group in the European Parliament.

In addition to her committee assignments, Spurek is a member of the European Parliament Intergroup on Climate Change, Biodiversity and Sustainable Development; the European Parliament Intergroup on Disability; the European Parliament Intergroup on LGBT Rights; and the European Parliament Intergroup on the Welfare and Conservation of Animals.

Spurek was also discussed in news media as the 2020 The Left (a left-wing to centre-left political alliance in Poland) candidate for President of Poland, but eventually did not run.

In September 2020, Spurek resigned from the S&D Group and instead joined the Greens/EFA Group. She subsequently became a vice-chair of the Committee on Women's Rights and Gender Equality.

Political positions
In the European Parliament, Spurek has been pushing for stronger EU-wide animal rights rules. She also worked on the strengthening of anti-violence laws and the ratification by the European Union of the Council of Europe's anti-violence convention.

References

Living people
1976 births
MEPs for Poland 2019–2024
Spring (political party) MEPs
Spring (political party) politicians
Polish human rights activists
Women human rights activists
Polish women's rights activists